Ahsan Habib (2 January 1917 – 10 July 1985) was a Bangladeshi poet and literary figure in Bengali culture. He was born in the village of Shankarpasha, in Pirojpur. Before the India-Pakistan partition, he worked on several literary magazines: Takbir, Bulbul (1937–38) and The Saogat (1939-43) and he was a staff artiste at the Kolkata Centre of All India Radio. After partition he came to Dhaka and worked on Daily Azad, Monthly Mohammadi, Daily Krishak, Daily Ittehad, Weekly Prabaha, etc.

Early life
He was born in Pirojpur district. His father's name is Hamijuddin Hawladar and his mother's name is Jomila Khatun. He had been writing poem since his school life. While reading in Brojomohun College, he shifted to Kolkata for livelihood.

Literary works

Poems
His first book of poetry was Ratri Shesh. Others include:
 Chhaya Horin (1962)
 Shara Dupur (1964)
 Ashay Boshoty (1974)
 Megh Bole Choitrey Jabo (1976)
 Duhate Dui Adim Pathar (1980)

For children
 Josna Rater Golpo
 Brsti Pare Tapur Tupur (1977)
 Chutir Din Dupure (1978)

Novels
 Ranee Khaler Shako (for teenagers)
 Aronno Neelima
 Zafrani Rong Payra

Awards
Ahsan Habib received several awards for his literary achievements, including:
 UNESCO Literary Prize (1960–61)
 Bangla Academy Literary Award (1961)
 Adamjee Literary Award (1964)
 Nasiruddin Gold Medal (1977)
 Ekushey Padak (1978)
 Jatiya (National) Padak
 Abul Mansur Ahmed Memorial Prize (1980)
 Abul Kalam Memorial Prize (1984)

References

20th-century Bangladeshi poets
20th-century Bengali poets
Bengali-language poets
Bengali-language writers
1917 births
1985 deaths
People from Barisal
University of Calcutta alumni
Recipients of the Ekushey Padak
Recipients of the Independence Day Award
Recipients of Bangla Academy Award
Bengali male poets
Bangladeshi male poets
20th-century Bangladeshi male writers
Recipients of the Adamjee Literary Award
Bengali Muslims